"Life" is a song recorded by the Swedish musician E-Type featuring Na Na. It was released in October 2001 as the second single from his third album Euro IV Ever and was a hit in several countries, particularly in Sweden and Norway where it reached the top 5.

Track listings
 CD maxi - Europe (2001)	
 "Life" (Radio Version) - 3:42
 "Life" (Extended Version) - 4:23
 "Life" (Pierre J's New-Type Remix) - 8:33
 "Life" (Pierre J's Radio Mix) - 3:58

Certifications

Charts

Weekly charts

Year-end charts

References

2001 singles
Electronic songs
E-Type (musician) songs
Nana Hedin songs
Song recordings produced by Max Martin
2001 songs
Number-one singles in Sweden